John Watson Morton (September 19, 1842 – November 21, 1914) was an American Confederate military officer, farmer and politician. Educated at the Western Military Institute, he entered military service soon after graduation, with the outbreak of war. He served as captain of artillery under General Nathan Bedford Forrest in the Confederate States Army during the American Civil War. Afterward he was the founder of the Nashville chapter of the Ku Klux Klan during the Reconstruction era.

Although Morton studied medicine after the war and practiced as a physician for two years, he decided to go into farming. He led various agricultural societies and served as the Tennessee Secretary of State from 1901 to 1909.

Early life
John Watson Morton was born on September 19, 1842 in Williamson County, Tennessee to Dr John A. Morton and his wife Sarah Buchanan. He had a brother, Thomas P. Morton. The family moved to Nashville, Tennessee in 1854.

Morton was educated at the private Western Military Institute. At the outset of the American Civil War of 1861-1865, he joined the Rock City Guards, a Nashville militia. He subsequently served as the captain of artillery under General Nathan Bedford Forrest in the Confederate States Army. He was the youngest captain in the Confederate forces. He subsequently wrote a book about his war service.

After the war, Morton studied medicine at the University of Nashville, graduating as valedictorian in 1867.

Career
After the war Morton was the founder of the Nashville chapter of the Ku Klux Klan. Morton initiated former general Nathan Bedford Forrest into the KKK, in Room 10 of the Maxwell House Hotel in fall of 1866. 

Morton practiced medicine for two years, until he decided to take up farming in Tennessee. From 1881 to 1901, he served as the editor of Tennessee Farmer, an agrarian journal. He also served as the president of the Tennessee Farmers' Publishing Company.

Morton served as assistant commissioner of agriculture of Tennessee from 1891 to 1896. He assisted with the Tennessee Centennial and International Exposition of 1897, and he subsequently published a book entitled The History of the Tennessee Centennial. He served as the first president of the Tennessee Fruit and Vegetable Growers' Association.

Morton was a member of the Democratic Party. He served as the Tennessee Secretary of State from 1901 to 1909.

Personal life and death

Morton was married twice. He first married Annie Humphreys, the daughter of Confederate Judge West Hughes Humphreys and his wife, and granddaughter of Congressman Parry Wayne Humphreys, on September 15, 1868. He married Ellen Bourne Tynes on August 6, 1901. He had two sons, John W. Morton, Jr., an attorney in Nashville, and West H. Morton, the register of Davidson County, Tennessee, and a daughter, Mrs Samuel A. Stout of Memphis. He was a member of the Methodist Episcopal Church, South. He was also a Freemason and an Elk.

Morton died on November 21, 1914 in Memphis, Tennessee. He was buried in his Confederate uniform at the Mount Olivet Cemetery in Nashville, Tennessee.

Works

References

External links

The artillery of Nathan Bedford Forrest's cavalry : "the wizard of the saddle" on the Internet Archive

1842 births
1914 deaths
People from Williamson County, Tennessee
People of Tennessee in the American Civil War
Politicians from Nashville, Tennessee
Confederate States Army officers
Editors of Tennessee newspapers
Farmers from Tennessee
Physicians from Tennessee
Secretaries of State of Tennessee
Tennessee Democrats
American Freemasons
American Ku Klux Klan members
Burials at Mount Olivet Cemetery (Nashville)